The Unica is a river in Slovenia. It starts as the underground confluence of the Pivka and the Rak in Planinska jama. This is the largest confluence of underground rivers in Europe.  further, the Unica emerges near Planina. It flows north through the Planina Karst Field (Planinsko Polje) through the municipalities of Postojna, Cerknica, and Logatec, where it returns underground. It then flows for about another  underground, emerging  lower at multiple springs near Vrhnika to form the Ljubljanica River.

References

External links
Planinsko polje
Geopedia.si
dedi.si image: http://services.dedi.si/DEDIServer/res/media/image/1176/STRICT/100?1265369496

Rivers of Inner Carniola
Subterranean rivers
Municipality of Postojna
Municipality of Cerknica
Municipality of Logatec